Haynes v. United States, 390 U.S. 85 (1968), was a United States Supreme Court decision interpreting the Fifth Amendment to the United States Constitution's self-incrimination clause. Haynes extended the Fifth Amendment protections elucidated in Marchetti v. United States.

Background of the case
The National Firearms Act of 1934 required the registration of certain types of firearms. Miles Edward Haynes was a convicted felon who was charged with failing to register a firearm under the Act. Haynes argued that, because he was a convicted felon and thus prohibited from owning a firearm, requiring him to register any firearms in his possession was requiring him to make an open admission to the government that he was in violation of the law, which was essentially a violation of his right not to incriminate himself.

Majority opinion
In a 7-1 decision, the Court ruled in 1968 in favor of Haynes. Earl Warren dissented in a one sentence opinion and Thurgood Marshall did not participate in the ruling.

As with many other 5th amendment cases, felons and others prohibited from possessing firearms could not be compelled to incriminate themselves through registration. The National Firearms Act was amended after Haynes to make it apply only to those who could lawfully possess a firearm. This eliminated prosecution of prohibited persons, such as criminals, and  cured the self-incrimination problem. In this new form, the new registration provision was upheld. The court held:
"  To eliminate the defects revealed by Haynes, Congress amended the Act so that only a possessor who lawfully makes, manufactures, or imports firearms can and must register them",  United States v. Freed, 401 U.S. 601 (1971). The original Haynes decision continues to block state prosecutions of criminals who fail to register guns as required by various state law gun registration schemes.

See also
List of United States Supreme Court cases, volume 390

References

Further reading

External links
 

United States Supreme Court cases
United States Supreme Court cases of the Warren Court
United States administrative case law
United States Fifth Amendment self-incrimination case law
United States federal firearms case law
1968 in United States case law